Bertolin is a surname likely originating somewhere around Northern Italy. It is believed to be a patronymic name that possibly derives from modifications of similar first names such as; Bertolin, Bartolus, Bertolus Berthold or Bertholin. The prefix "bert" may derive from the Lombard word "berht" (meaning bright).

Notable people
Notable people with this surname include:
Brunello Bertolin (born 1943), Italian male long-distance runner
 (born 1924), Italian footballer
 (born 1938), Italian restorer and sculptor.

Surname frequency and distribution within Italy
www.forebears.io 2014 data

See also
Bertolini
Bertolino

References
 
 

Italian-language surnames
Surnames of Italian origin
Patronymic surnames